The 1952 Grand National was the 106th renewal of the Grand National horse race that took place at Aintree Racecourse near Liverpool, England, on 5 April 1952.

The race went off ten minutes late, after the field breached the starting tape, prompting a false start. It was won by Teal, a 100/7 shot ridden by jockey Arthur Thompson and trained by Neville Crump. Thompson and Crump were victorious in the steeplechase in 1948 also, with Sheila's Cottage, at odds of 50/1.

In second place was Legal Joy, third was Wot No Son, and Uncle Barney finished fourth.

Forty-seven horses ran, and all but one returned safely to the stables. Skouras was euthanised after incurred a cervical fracture falling at Becher's Brook.

Finishing order

Non-finishers

References

 1952
Grand National
Grand National
Grand National
20th century in Lancashire